Ronald A. Mills (June 23, 1943 – December 22, 2008) was a Canadian curler from Saskatoon, Saskatchewan.

Mills was a level four coach, and served as head statistician for the first five Continental Cups. 

Mills worked for the Federated Co-Op for most of his life, where he worked in computer and internet technology skills, which he used in his work as a statistician for the Canadian Curling Association. He died of cancer.

Awards
Canadian Curling Hall of Fame: 1985 (with all 1980 World champions team skipped by Rick Folk)
Saskatchewan Sports Hall of Fame: 1980 (1980 Rick Folk Curling Team)

Teams

References

External links
 
 Ron Mills – Curling Canada Stats Archive
 Ron Mills Gallery | The Trading Card Database
 Saskatchewan Sports: Lives Past and Present - Google Books (page 44)

1943 births
2008 deaths
Canadian male curlers
World curling champions
Brier champions
Curlers from Saskatoon
Deaths from cancer in Saskatchewan
Canadian curling coaches